The Opel Frogster was a concept car built by Opel in 2001. It premièred at the September 2001 Frankfurt Motor Show. The Frogster could be transformed from a convertible to a roadster or a pickup truck by using a built in PDA, which was mounted between the two front seats. The Frogster was mainly targeted towards younger buyers. There are no plans for the Frogster to go into production.

Technology
The Opel Frogster boasted a lot of new technology not yet used by any production automobile. It featured a PDA between the two front seats, that could be used to control most of the functions of the car. It is also unusual, this being in that it could literally transform the car into three different body styles.

Heritage
The Opel Frogster was named from an early Opel model from the 1920s called the "Laubfrosch". The Laubfrosch was nicknamed the "Tree Frog" by the younger crowd, because of its bright green colour. When Opel designers were thinking of creating a new concept car, they were excited by the new Opel Speedster. While thinking of creating the look of the new concept car, someone called out to "paint it green and call it the Frogster".

References

External links
Automotive Intelligence Opel Frogster Article

Frogster